The Our Lady of Victory Cathedral  also called Daimyomachi Church is a religious building affiliated with the Catholic Church which is located in the city of Fukuoka, in the Asian country of Japan. It is dedicated to Our Lady of Victory.

In 1896, a small wooden church was built on the site where the present church is located. In 1938, the number of faithful from Fukuoka rose sharply, hence the need to expand the church. It was rebuilt and reinforced with red brick.

In 1984 a restructuring of the church into a cathedral began. It was demolished in 1986 and a modern concrete church was built in its place. The main altar is the only part of the old cathedral that was preserved.

The church follows the Roman or Latin rite and is the main church of the Catholic diocese of Fukuoka (Dioecesis Fukuokaensis; カトリック福岡教区) which was created in 1927 with the Papal brief Catholicae Fidei under the pontificate of Pope Pius XI.

See also
Roman Catholicism in Japan

References

Roman Catholic cathedrals in Japan
Buildings and structures in Fukuoka
Roman Catholic churches completed in 1986
20th-century Roman Catholic church buildings in Japan